KEWR may refer to:

 KEWR-LP, a low-power radio station (97.5 FM) licensed to serve Cedar Rapids, Iowa, United States
 Newark Liberty International Airport (ICAO code KEWR)